Ronald Collet Norman JP  (15 November 1873 – 5 December 1963) was a banker, administrator and politician.
He was chairman of the Board of Governors of the BBC from 1935 to 1939 and of the London County Council from 1918 to 1919.

Biography

Norman was the son of Frederick Norman of the Norman family, long prominent in banking. He was educated at Trinity College, Cambridge (MA 1901).

In March 1900, he was appointed an assistant private secretary (unpaid) to the (Conservative) Under-Secretary of State for War, George Wyndham.

In 1907 he was elected to the London County Council as a Municipal Reformer. From 1918-1919 he served as chairman and was an Alderman of the council from 1922-1934. He served as the vice-chairman of the National Trust during the 1930s, but he declined the chairmanship, because he was not "a great landowner". He placed the Trust's finance committee on a more professional footing; it subsequently fell to his son Mark Norman to chair that committee through the difficult economic circumstances of the 1970s. From 1933 to 1935 he served as vice-chairman of the BBC, and was chairman from 1935 to April, 1939.

Descendants 

Norman married Lady Florence Sibell Bridgeman (1877–1959), a daughter of the 4th Earl of Bradford. They had three sons and one daughter: 
Brigadier Hugh Norman (1905–1979); father of
Patricia Norman (b. 27 May 1940), former wife of Henry Colum Crichton-Stuart and now wife of the 3rd Baron Kindersley;
Mark Norman (1910–1994), a successful merchant banker;
 David Norman
 Isabella Julia Norman is married to Timothy Nicholas Sean Knatchbull, a descendant of Queen Victoria through her great-grandson Louis Mountbatten, 1st Earl Mountbatten of Burma.
Sibyl Margaret Norman (1908–2010) who married 1stly Archibald Edward Cubitt (16 January 1901 – 13 Feb 1972); they had issue 1 son and 1 surviving daughter.
 (Mark) Robin Cubitt (13 June 1936 – 1991), who was father of three sons, including
 Mark Edward Cubitt, 5th Baron Ashcombe (b. 29 February 1964)
 Priscilla Cubitt (b. 30 May 1941) is the third wife of the 11th Earl of Harrington, and they are parents of
 Lady Isabella Stanhope, wife of the 7th Earl Cawdor.
Richard Norman (1917–1994) who married an Anglo-Spanish aristocrat, descended from the Bourbon duques de Marchena (Dukes of Marchena) themselves descended morganatically from Spanish kings.

Family connections

Through the Bridgemans, the Normans descended from Ronald Collet Norman and Lady Florence are thus related to several prominent English and Scottish aristocrats including the Duke of Gloucester (whose maternal grandmother was a sister of Lady Florence Norman), the 7th Marquess of Salisbury (whose maternal great-grandmother was another sister), the 9th Duke of Buccleuch (whose paternal grandmother, shared with the Duke of Gloucester, was a sister of Lady Florence), and so forth.

His brother Montagu Norman, became a long serving Governor of the Bank of England and was elevated to the peerage as the 1st Baron Norman (but that title is now extinct, Lord Norman having had no issue). Both their grandfathers were directors.

Sources

 is shown for his marriage and some of his descendants.
 was the wife of Ronald Collet Norman, and the mother of all his children.
 was the youngest son.
 shows one of Ronald Collet Norman's granddaughters, formerly wife of the 3rd Baron Kindersley.
 is Ronald Collet Norman's great-granddaughter and now The Countess Cawdor.

1873 births
1963 deaths
Alumni of Trinity College, Cambridge
English bankers
Chairmen of the BBC
General and operations managers
British bankers
Members of London County Council
BBC Governors
Municipal Reform Party politicians
National Trust people